Mohammed Jumaa (born 28 January 1997) is an association football player who plays for Shabab Al-Ahli.

International career

International goals
Scores and results list the United Arab Emirates' goal tally first.

Reference

External link
 

Emirati footballers
1997 births
Living people
Al Shabab Al Arabi Club Dubai players
Shabab Al-Ahli Club players
Emirati people of Baloch descent
UAE Pro League players
Association football wingers